Acton Bridge is a civil parish in Cheshire West and Chester, England.  It is mainly rural and contains the village of Acton Bridge.  The parish is traversed by the River Weaver and Weaver Navigation in an east–west direction, the West Coast Main Line in a north–south direction, and the A49 road runs from northwest to southeast.  It contains nine buildings that are recorded in the National Heritage List for England as designated listed buildings.  Two of these are listed at Grade II*, and the other seven at Grade II.  Most of the buildings are houses or farm buildings, but the list also includes a railway viaduct, a lock on the Weaver Navigation, and a guidepost.

Key

Listed buildings

See also

Listed buildings in Crowton
Listed buildings in Dutton
Listed buildings in Little Leigh
Listed buildings in Weaverham

References
Citations

Sources

Listed buildings in Cheshire West and Chester
Lists of listed buildings in Cheshire